Guilty at 17 is a 2014 Canadian drama film starring Erin Sanders and Chloe Rose. It was directed by Matt West, Divya D'Souza and Joseph J. Gillanders. It premiered on the Lifetime channel in 2014.

Plot 
High School Chemistry teacher, Gilbert Adkins is accused by one of his students, Devon Cavanor, of sexually molesting her. Devon persuades another student, Traci Scott, to back up her story by lying that she saw the incident. Gilbert is arrested by the police. It is later revealed that Devon had been lying from the start. Devon had been promised a car by her father if she achieved good grades but she had failed an exam and complained that Gilbert had not given her enough time to prepare. Gilbert also suspects that she had broken his laptop. Devon then tried to ruin Gilbert's reputation with her accusation.

Gilbert has spent 30 years building his career and is concerned that it may all be wasted. He tells this to his brother and his daughter, June, who both promise to support him. Gilbert visits Traci's father Don to tell him of the seriousness of his position and to ask him to get Traci to recant her story which Gilbert tells Don is false. Don asks Traci who says that she was telling the truth. Traci then discovers from another student that Devon has been known to lie in the past.

June flies home from Uganda but by the time she arrives Gilbert is suspected to have apparently jumped from a bridge to commit suicide. A suicide note, which had been written on a computer, is found in his car nearby. June cannot believe that her father would do this and suspects that he has been murdered. Her suspicion is reinforced when she later discovers that Gilbert's laptop contained no such note.

Traci is upset when she learns of Gilbert's death and confronts Devon who is adamant that they both stick to their stories and insists to Traci that she was telling the truth about Gilbert's attack on her. Devon meets her boyfriend Jay to discuss the situation. At this point it is revealed that Devon had lied about Gilbert's attack and that Jay came up with the plan to destroy Gilbert's laptop after stealing some exam questions from it so that Devon could pass her next exam.

Meanwhile a toxicology report shows that Gilbert's body contained an overdose of a sedative when he died indicating that he may not have committed suicide. June also discovers that Jay has a criminal record, having been in and out of jail several times.

Devon's father presents her with a brand new car after she achieves good grades by cheating in her next exam, using the information Jay had obtained before destroying Gilbert's laptop. The next time Devon meets Jay he tells it was easier than he had thought it would be to kill Gilbert. When Traci sees Devon driving the car she confronts her again and informs her that she is going to tell all to the police. She also tells her that June is Gilbert's daughter. Traci cycles to the local hospital where her father is recovering from a heart attack, to inform her parents before she goes to the police. On her way there Jay, who has been following her in his pickup truck, runs her off the road. A worried Devon arranges to meet June at the high school where she promises to tell June something important about Traci. When they meet Devon lies again to try to lay the blame for everything on Jay. But Jay appears carrying a gun and contradicts what Devon is saying. It turns out that Jay had injected Gilbert with the sedative overdose while Gilbert was asleep. The situation becomes tense and results in Jay fatally shooting himself in desperation.

Later Devon decides to plead guilty about the whole episode.

Cast 
 Erin Sanders as Traci Scott 
 Chloe Rose as Devon Cavanor
 Rob Stewart as Gibert Adkins
 Alex Paxton-Beesley as June Gailey
 Vanessa Morgan as Leigh
 Michael Woods as Don Scott, Traci's father
 Catherine Dent as Mrs. Scott
 Zack Peladeau as Jay, Devon's boyfriend

References 

2014 television films
2014 films
Lifetime (TV network) films
Canadian drama television films
English-language Canadian films
2010s Canadian films